The Duck Creek Trail is a crushed limestone trail in Outagamie and Brown Counties in northeast Wisconsin. The Duck Creek Trail spans , beginning at the eastern end of the Newton Blackmour State Trail, just east of Vanderheuvel Road in Seymour. The trail continues east through the Oneida Nation of Wisconsin in northern Outagamie County paralleling State Route 54, and continues to the Village of Oneida. The Duck Creek Trail will eventually extend to Pamperin Park in Green Bay.

The combined trails extend from Village of Oneida to New London.

Access
The trail is open to bicyclists, walkers, joggers, horseback riders, and pets on leashes. In the winter the trail is open to cross-country skiing, and snowshoeing.

Amenities
Ten minutes east of the trail in Ashwaubenon, there are hotels and bike shops. In the village of Oneida there is a convenience store/gas station. Continuing west, the trail connects with the Newton Blackmour State Trail. Continuing on that trail to downtown Seymour, there are various restaurants, a grocery store, and a gas station very close to the trail.

See also 
List of bike trails in Wisconsin
List of hiking trails in Wisconsin
List of rail trails
Rails-to-Trails Conservancy

References 
 

Tourist attractions in Brown County, Wisconsin
Tourist attractions in Outagamie County, Wisconsin